Tom Steven (born 5 September 1954) is a retired Scottish football midfielder who played in the Scottish League for Berwick Rangers, Forfar Athletic, East Fife, Hamilton Academical and Hibernian. After his retirement as a player, he managed Cowdenbeath and Edinburgh City.

Career statistics

References 

Scottish footballers
Cowdenbeath F.C. players
Scottish Football League players
Association football midfielders
Forfar Athletic F.C. players
1954 births
Living people
Footballers from Edinburgh
Scottish expatriate footballers
Expatriate soccer players in Australia
Scottish expatriate sportspeople in Australia
Dunbar United F.C. players
Hibernian F.C. players
Hamilton Academical F.C. players
Berwick Rangers F.C. players
East Fife F.C. players
Dunfermline Athletic F.C. players
Cowdenbeath F.C. managers
F.C. Edinburgh managers
Scottish Football League managers
Scottish football managers